Vauvenargues (Provençal: Vauvenarga) is a commune in the Bouches-du-Rhône department in southern France. It is close to Aix-en-Provence and the Montagne Sainte-Victoire.

Population

Chateau of Vauvenargues

The chateau in Vauvenargues stands on the site of a Roman fort which eventually was incorporated in a medieval fortress controlled by the Counts of Provence and later the Archbishops of Aix. For 250 years until the French revolution it was the seat of the de Clapiers family, who rebuilt the chateau in its present form and on whom Louis XV bestowed the title Marquis of Vauvernagues. For 150 years after that it was occupied by the d'Isoard family. In the mid-twentieth century its connection with French nobility lapsed. It was eventually bought in 1958 by Pablo Picasso, who was resident until 1962. Picasso and his wife Jacqueline are buried in the forecourt of the chateau, which is still the private property of the Picasso family.

See also
Communes of the Bouches-du-Rhône department

References

External links
Official website

Communes of Bouches-du-Rhône
Bouches-du-Rhône communes articles needing translation from French Wikipedia